The Crucifixion is a painting in tempera and gold on panel of  attributed to Giotto, now in the Musée des Beaux-Arts (inventory number 167) of Strasbourg, France.

History
Previously attributed to the school of Giotto, Roberto Longhi attributed it to the master himself in 1948. Art historians Gnudi and Salvini did not include the work in their catalogue of Giotto's works. William Suida, Pietro Toesca, and Offner attribute the work to a "Master of the Strasbourg Crucifixion" to which they also attribute the Berlin Crucifixion, a similar work in small format. Even today critics are uncertain about the work's attribution, although it has unambiguously been attributed to Giotto on major occasions such as the 2013 Giotto exhibition in the Louvre.

Description and style
The scene follows traditional iconography, with the experimental innovations of the Crucifixion in Scrovegni Chapel. The cross of Christ occupies the center of the painting, on a uniform gold ground. Grieving angels crowd around the figure of Christ, while below Mary Magdalene (wearing red) embraces the cross. Two groups stand at the sides, leaving the central section isolated. At left is a group of pious women with Mary, who is fainting. At right, there is Saint John the Baptist and a centurion, who is raising his arm. Their presence is all typical of Crucifixion iconography. 

One innovation is the manner in which the figures are cut off by the borders of the painting, giving the impression of a gather of figures larger than that represented on the panel.

Comparable works

References

External links 
 Crucifixon , presentation on the museum's website

Paintings by Giotto
1310s paintings
Paintings in the collection of the Musée des Beaux-Arts de Strasbourg
Paintings depicting Mary Magdalene
Paintings depicting the Crucifixion of Jesus